Çəmənli may refer to:

 Çəmənli, Agdam, Azerbaijan
 Çəmənli, Barda, Azerbaijan
 Çəmənli, Beylagan (disambiguation)
 Aşağı Çəmənli, Azerbaijan
 Yuxarı Çəmənli, Azerbaijan
 Çəmənli, Jalilabad, Azerbaijan
 Çəmənli, Nakhchivan, Azerbaijan

See also
 Çimenli (disambiguation)